Ameriabank CJSC  is an Armenian universal bank offering corporate, investment and retail banking services headquartered in Yerevan, Armenia.

It was established in 1910 as a branch of Caucasian Trade Bank, which during the Soviet era was transformed to the Armenian branch of the USSR Vneshtorgbank. It became a standalone bank again in 1992 after it obtained a banking license from the Central Bank of Armenia. By 2014, it had won the Euromoney award for best bank in Armenia three times.

In 2014, the bank introduced AmeriaToken, a one-time password generator.

Gallery

See also

List of banks
List of banks in Armenia

References

External links
 Official website

Banks of Armenia
Banks established in 1910
1910 establishments in the Ottoman Empire
Banks of the Soviet Union
Companies nationalised by the Soviet Union